"For Your Love" is a song by The Yardbirds.

For Your Love may also refer to:

For Your Love (album), a 1965 album by The Yardbirds
"For Your Love" (Ed Townsend song), 1958 song written and performed by Townsend, notably covered by Peaches & Herb
"For Your Love" (Frankie Laine song), a cover by Frankie Laine of the Italian 1964 hit by Bobby Solo titled "Una lacrima sul viso"
For Your Love, album and single by Chilly, cover of the Yardbirds song
"For Your Love" (Stevie Wonder song), 1995
For Your Love (TV series), an American sitcom
"For Your Love", a song by Bad Boys Blue
"For Your Love", a song by Chris LeDoux released in 1994 that hit #50 on the Billboard Country singles chart.
"For Your Love", a song by Impellitteri from Screaming Symphony
"For Your Love", a song by Jessica Simpson from Irresistible
"For Your Love", a song by Rachael Lampa from Kaleidoscope
"For Your Love", a song by Tevin Campbell from Tevin Campbell
"For Your Love", a song by U2 that would eventually become "Stand Up Comedy"

See also
I Just Wanna Stop